Madison Township is one of the ten townships of Fayette County, Ohio, United States. As of the 2010 census the population was 1,122, up from 946 at the 2000 census.

Geography
Located in the northeastern corner of the county, it borders the following townships:
 Pleasant Township, Madison County - north
 Monroe Township, Pickaway County - east
 Perry Township, Pickaway County - southeast
 Marion Township - south
 Paint Township - west
 Range Township, Madison County - northwest

No municipalities are located in Madison Township.

Name and history
It is one of twenty Madison Townships statewide.

Government
The township is governed by a three-member board of trustees, who are elected in November of odd-numbered years to a four-year term beginning on the following January 1. Two are elected in the year after the presidential election and one is elected in the year before it. There is also an elected township fiscal officer, who serves a four-year term beginning on April 1 of the year after the election, which is held in November of the year before the presidential election. Vacancies in the fiscal officership or on the board of trustees are filled by the remaining trustees.

References

External links
 County website

Townships in Fayette County, Ohio
Townships in Ohio